WPTD (channel 16) is a television station in Dayton, Ohio, United States, serving the Miami Valley as a member of PBS. The station's transmitter is located near South Gettysburg Avenue in the Highview Hills neighborhood in southwest Dayton. Its signal is relayed by translator station W25FI-D in Maplewood, Ohio (which provides PBS programming to the Lima/Findlay market.)

WPTD has a sister station, WPTO (channel 14) also a PBS member. Licensed to Oxford, WPTO is a secondary PBS station for the Cincinnati market, alongside that city's primary PBS outlet, WCET (channel 48). WPTO's transmitter is located in the Clifton Heights neighborhood of Cincinnati.

Together, WPTD and WPTO are known as the ThinkTV Network (stylized as ThinkTV): WPTD is ThinkTV 16, and WPTO is ThinkTV 14. Despite shared branding, WPTO is not a satellite of WPTD; the two stations are separately programmed, with almost no overlap, except during pledge drives. ThinkTV is a subsidiary of Public Media Connect, a regional non-profit company, which also owns WCET. Master control and internal operations for all three stations are at ThinkTV's facility on South Jefferson Street in downtown Dayton.

WPTD's broadcast coverage includes much of southwestern Ohio, including Dayton and Cincinnati, and parts of eastern Indiana. Most of WPTO's coverage area, which is smaller, overlaps WPTD's; WPTO's is concentrated in the extreme southwest corner of Ohio, providing a stronger signal to Cincinnati than to Dayton. Both stations are available on Charter Communications' cable television service throughout southwestern Ohio, though some providers may offer only WPTD's digital subchannels or WPTO's, depending on their location.

History

Commercial
Beginning in April 1967, a commercial independent and sometime ABC-affiliated station, WKTR-TV, occupied channel 16. The station was owned by Kittyhawk Television Corporation and licensed to Kettering. Throughout the beginning of 1969, ABC was close to buying WKTR-TV for about $1.85 million. The purchase was called off due to the opposition of rival station WKEF (channel 22), which at the time was airing most ABC programming in the market. WKTR-TV received the primary ABC affiliation in November 1969, effective January 1, 1970. WKEF filed an antitrust lawsuit against ABC and WKTR-TV in December. On February 20, 1970, Thomas G. Sullivan, an ABC regional manager, was charged with accepting a $20,000 bribe from WKTR-TV in exchange for promoting primary ABC affiliation for the station. On February 26, ABC announced that its affiliation agreement with WKTR-TV would end effective August 30, and that the affiliation competition between WKTR-TV and WKEF would be reopened. Additionally, on February 27, John A. Kemper, Jr., chair of Kittyhawk, resigned from its board. In a May 1970 ruling on a WKEF filing, an Ohio court ordered ABC to restore WKEF's affiliation status as of December 1969, and for Kittyhawk not to interfere. Sullivan pleaded guilty to a bribery charge on May 21. In August 1970, Kittyhawk announced that WKTR-TV would be sold "to a group of veteran broadcasters located in the West". In September, WKEF filed a petition with the Federal Communications Commission (FCC) urging that WKTR-TV's license not be renewed. Nothing came of the sale or the license denial, and the station, now operating as an independent, went dark on February 27, 1971. It returned to the air with a limited schedule from April until October while a license transfer to the Ohio Educational Broadcasting Network Commission (OEB) was pending FCC approval.

Non-commercial 
WPTD first signed on the air on April 24, 1972 as WOET-TV (standing for "Ohio Educational Television"), operated by OEB. The FCC formally reallocated the frequency as non-commercial September 14, 1977.

WPTO began broadcasting on October 14, 1959 as WMUB-TV, operated by Miami University. The call letters matched those of then co-owned WMUB radio, and stood for "Miami University Broadcasting". It was the secondary educational station in the Cincinnati area, alongside future sister WCET.

The two stations joined forces in 1975 under the banner of University Regional Broadcasting, a consortium of Miami, Wright State and Central State universities. WMUB-TV served as the primary station for a year, until WOET-TV became the primary station in 1976. In 1977, the stations were transferred to a new community organization, Greater Dayton Public Television, and received their current callsigns, with WOET-TV becoming WPTD and WMUB-TV becoming WPTO.

From the creation of University Regional Broadcasting onward, the secondary station operated as a semi-satellite of the primary station, only rarely airing different, usually local public affairs-type, programs. This situation existed until cable television began to become widely available in Cincinnati and Dayton. As cable availability rose, Greater Dayton Public Television began to differentiate its stations' programming gradually, with the stations eventually becoming separately programmed.

The stations rebranded themselves as the ThinkTV Network in 1998, though the legal name remained Greater Dayton Public Television.

On October 31, 2008, Greater Dayton Public Television and the Greater Cincinnati Television Educational Foundation (CET), owner of WCET, announced plans to merge their resources into one non-profit organization serving all of Southwest Ohio, while maintaining separate identities. The merger completed on May 8, 2009 with the formation of Public Media Connect, Inc. Both ThinkTV and CET operate as subsidiaries under the new organization. The merger resulted in the July 2010 transfer of WCET's master control operations to ThinkTV's facilities in Dayton.

The ThinkTV channels and WCET were off the air (and not available through any other providers) from just after 4 p.m. on July 5 until 11:40 a.m. on July 9, 2019 due to the failure of a multiplexer in the master control power supply at ThinkTV in downtown Dayton.

On November 15, 2019, per an agreement with Greater Dayton Public Television, WHIO-TV (channel 7), which had suffered a transmitter failure on November 5, requested special temporary authority from the FCC to transmit its main (CBS) subchannel over WPTD's subchannel 16.2, displacing the "16 Again" service. On November 18, subchannel 16.2 began broadcasting WHIO-TV programming. On November 21, WHIO-TV repaired its transmitter and normal content was restored to subchannel 16.2.

On May 15, 2020, there was a pro forma transfer of WPTO's license from Greater Dayton Public Television to Greater Cincinnati Television Educational Foundation.

Digital television

Analog-to-digital conversion
On May 1, 2003, ThinkTV marked the beginning of its conversion to digital technology with the introduction of four new digital program services and a digital simulcast channel for WPTD. WPTD originally operated its digital signal on UHF channel 58. One year later in May 2004, ThinkTV entered phase two of its digital conversion with the installation of new digital master control equipment and the introduction of new digital channels for WPTO. WPTO operated its digital signal on UHF channel 28, broadcasting from Cincinnati.

During this period, the digital channels were 16.2 (ThinkTV 16 DT), 16.3 (ThinkTV 16 Again), 16.4 (ThinkTV 16 Create), 16.5 (ThinkTV 16 Ohio) and 16.6 (ThinkTV HD) for WPTD; and 14.2 (ThinkTV 14 DT), 14.3 (ThinkTV 14 Prime), 14.4 (ThinkTV 14 Learn, carrying PBS Kids and college telecourses), 14.5 (ThinkTV 14 World) and 14.6 (ThinkTV HD). Neither WPTD nor WPTO had an x.1 subchannel; the x.2 subchannels matched their respective analog channels; also, 16.6 and 14.6 carried identical PBS HD programming, which was distinct from the separate analog programming on WPTD and on WPTO.

On May 1, 2009, just over one month before full-power television stations in the United States were scheduled to transition from analog to digital broadcasts under federal mandate, WPTD shut down its analog signal over UHF channel 16 and WPTO shut down its analog signal, broadcasting from Oxford, over UHF channel 14. WPTD's digital signal relocated from its pre-transition UHF channel 58, which was among the high band UHF channels (52-69) that were removed from broadcasting use as a result of the transition, to its analog-era UHF channel 16; WPTO's digital signal remained on its pre-transition UHF channel 28, continuing to broadcast from Cincinnati, using PSIP to display WPTO's virtual channel as 14 on digital television receivers.

On the same day, the subchannels were realigned. On WPTD: ThinkTV 16 HD on 16.1, ThinkTV 16 Again on 16.2, ThinkTV 16 Create on 16.3, ThinkTV 16 Ohio on 16.4, and ThinkTV 16 DT (a standard-definition simulcast of 16.1) on 16.5. On WPTO: ThinkTV 14 HD on 14.1, ThinkTV 14 Prime on 14.2, ThinkTV 14 Learn on 14.3, ThinkTV 14 World on 14.4, and ThinkTV 14 DT (a standard-definition simulcast of 14.1) on 14.5.

WPTD's digital subchannel 16.3 was changed from ThinkTV 16 Create to ThinkTV 16 Life, carrying similar types of programming, later in 2009.

On January 16, 2017, both WPTD's digital subchannel 16.5 (ThinkTV 16 DT) and WPTO's digital subchannel 14.3 (ThinkTV 14 Learn) were changed to 24/7 carriage of PBS Kids.

In September 2017, WPTD's digital subchannel 16.4 was rebranded from ThinkTV 16 Ohio to ThinkTV 16 Ohio/World, with programming added from World.

WPTD moved its digital signal from channel 16 to channel 35, and WPTO moved its digital signal from channel 28 to channel 29, at 10 a.m. on October 18, 2019, as part of the FCC's spectrum reallocation process. WPTO operated at low power from that date until May 1, 2020. In addition, WPTD's Maplewood translator, W32DS-D, has moved its digital signal from channel 32 to channel 25, as W25FI-D.

Digital channels
The digital signals of WPTD and WPTO are both multiplexed:

While the "DT" designations have appeared on the ThinkTV website and have displayed on-screen via PSIP, they are omitted from ThinkTV's advertising and on-screen "bugs".

Translators

Per FCC filings, WPTD's translator station W17AA in Celina had authorization in 2009 to flash-cut to digital operations on UHF channel 17, at a tower site near its existing analog tower. However, before this conversion could be completed, W17AA suspended operations on January 5, 2011 due to circumstances beyond Greater Dayton Public Television's control, namely a loss of site. The tower owner, the State of Ohio, has plans to dismantle the tower utilized by W17AA, and in anticipation has disconnected power to the tower site location. As a result, GDPTV was forced to suspend operations on W17AA.  On January 14, 2011, GDPTV requested a six-month authorization to maintain silent (off-air) status. GDPTV then began the process of considering its options for modification of the W17AA license to allow for its resumption of service. On July 26, 2011, the FCC accepted GDPTV's surrender for cancellation of W17AA's license.

WPTD's other translator station, W63AH channel 63 in Maplewood, also had authorization in 2009 to switch to digital operations, on channel 32. However, W63AH suspended operations on March 30, 2010, also due to a loss of site, following a change in ownership for the translator station's licensed tower location. On April 5, 2010, GDPTV requested a six-month authorization to maintain silent status. On September 9, 2010, GDPTV was granted authorization to relocate its approved digital broadcast facility to a tower near Celina, with the community of license remaining Maplewood. On January 18, 2011, the station was granted "license to cover", allowing it to resume broadcasting. The station now operates digitally on channel 25, as W25FI-D (it officially took the W32DS callsign in May 2009).

W25FI-D covers both Celina and the Maplewood, Ohio, area and operates with a directional antenna towards the southeast.

See also

Channel 14 virtual TV stations in the United States
Channel 16 virtual TV stations in the United States
Channel 29 digital TV stations in the United States
Channel 35 digital TV stations in the United States
List of television stations in Ohio 
List of television stations in Ohio (by channel number)
List of television stations in the United States by call sign (initial letter W)

References

External links

History of UHF Television: WKTR-TV/16 & WKEF/22, Dayton OH

PBS member stations
Television channels and stations established in 1959
1959 establishments in Ohio
Television channels and stations established in 1972
1972 establishments in Ohio
Central State University
Miami University
Wright State University
PTD